Giovanni Tebaldi (1787–1852) was an Italian painter, active in a Neoclassical style.

Biography
Born at Parma, he was a pupil of Pietro Antonio Martini as a boy, but studied in Rome for some years.  He returned to Parma to become professor at the Academy of Fine Arts of Parma.
Among his pupils were Enrico Bandini and Francesco Scaramuzza.

References

1787 births
1852 deaths
19th-century Italian painters
Italian male painters
Painters from Parma
19th-century Italian male artists